Charles James Irwin Grant, only son of Charles William Grant, 5th Baron de Longueuil and Caroline Coffin, was born in Montreal on 1 April 1815. He served in the 79th Regiment as a lieutenant for a while. He later married Henriet Colmore, from whom he fathered two sons (Alexander Frederick, died age 2 and Charles Colmore) as well as a daughter. His wife Henriet died in 1847 and he remarried in Charleston, South Carolina on 18 January 1849 to Anne Trapman, second daughter of Louis Trapman, a consul. He had many children from this union including Reginald Charles and John Charles Moore. He died on 26 February 1879 at age 63.

Ancestry

References

1815 births
1879 deaths
Barons of Longueuil
Le Moyne family